The 1935–36 Serie C was the first edition of Serie C, the third highest league in the Italian football league system.

The fascists changed the championships names as a trick to restore the format of 1929. The National Division Serie C took the place of the old First Division and its four groups format.

Girone A

Final classification

Results

Girone B

Final classification

Results

Girone C

Final classification

Results

Girone D

Final classification

Results
 

1935-1936
3
Italy